Bartłomiej "Bartek" Pacuszka  (born 25 March 1990) is a retired Polish footballer who played as a defender for FC Twente, Heracles Almelo and OKS Start Otwock.

In 2006, he joined the FC Twente/Heracles Almelo football academy. In September 2008 he came off the bench during a second-round KNVB Cup match against ADO Den Haag.

On 2 February 2009 he joined Heracles Almelo on loan until the end of the season. On 7 March he made his Eredivisie debut, appearing in the starting eleven against De Graafschap and playing until the 64th minute.

External links 
 
 

1990 births
Living people
Polish footballers
Heracles Almelo players
FC Twente players
Eredivisie players
Footballers from Warsaw
Association football defenders